AFB Bloemspruit is an airbase of the South African Air Force. It is co-located with Bloemfontein Airport , and shares the airfield.

The base motto is Ex Unite Pax ("Peace Through Unity").

The unit is also responsible for maintaining the military airstrip at Vastrap, near Upington.

Units hosted
 16 Squadron - Attack helicopter squadron
 87 Helicopter Flying School - Helicopter training unit
 106 Squadron - Light transport reserve
 107 Squadron - Light transport reserve
 506 Squadron - Security services

Aviation
 Non-directional beacon - BL380.0
 VHF omnidirectional range - BLV114.1
 Automatic Terminal Information Service - 126.45

References

External links
AFB Bloemspruit Official Website

South African Air Force bases
Airports in South Africa
Airports of the British Commonwealth Air Training Plan
Transport in the Free State (province)
Bloemfontein